Butidae is a family of sleeper gobies in the order Gobiiformes. The family was formerly classified as a subfamily of the Eleotridae but the 5th Edition of Fishes of the World classifies it as a family in its own right. Molecular phylogenetic analyses have demonstrated that the Butidae are a sister clade to the clade containing the families Gobiidae and Gobionellidae and that the Eleotridae is a sister to both of these clades. This means that the Eloetridae as formerly classified was paraphyletic and that its subfamilies should be raised to the status of families.

The species in the Butidae are largely restricted to tropical and sub-tropical waters of Africa, Asia, Australia, and Oceania. They are especially diverse in New Guinea, Australia and New Zealand where they can be important components of brackish and freshwater ecosystems.

Genera
The following genera are classified within the family Butidae:

 Bostrychus Lacépède, 1801
 Butis Bleeker, 1856
 Incara Visweswara Rao, 1971
 Kribia Herre, 1946
 Odonteleotris Gill, 1863
 Ophiocara Gill, 1863
 Oxyeleotris Bleeker, 1874
 Parviparma Herre, 1927
 Pogoneleotris Bleeker, 1875
 Prionobutis Bleeker, 1874

References

 
Gobiiformes
Ray-finned fish families